In mathematics, the height zeta function of an algebraic variety or more generally a subset of a variety encodes the distribution of points of given height.

Definition
If S is a set with height function H, such that there are only finitely many elements of bounded height, define a counting function

and a zeta function

Properties
If Z has abscissa of convergence β and there is a constant c such that N has rate of growth 

then a version of the Wiener–Ikehara theorem holds: Z has a t-fold pole at s = β with residue c.a.Γ(t).

The abscissa of convergence has similar formal properties to the Nevanlinna invariant and it is conjectured that they are essentially the same.  More precisely, Batyrev–Manin conjectured the following.  Let X be a projective variety over a number field K with ample divisor D giving rise to an embedding and height function H, and let U denote a Zariski-open subset of X.  Let α = α(D) be the Nevanlinna invariant of D and β the abscissa of convergence of Z(U, H; s).  Then for every ε > 0 there is a U such that β < α + ε: in the opposite direction, if α > 0 then α = β for all sufficiently large fields K and sufficiently small U.

References

 
 

Diophantine geometry
Geometry of divisors